In automata theory, complementation of a Büchi automaton is construction of another Büchi automaton that recognizes the complement of the ω-regular language recognized by the given Büchi automaton. Existence of algorithms for this construction proves that the set of ω-regular languages is closed under complementation.

This construction is particularly hard relative to the constructions for the other closure properties of Büchi automata. The first construction was presented by Büchi in 1962. Later, other constructions were developed that enabled efficient and optimal complementation.

Büchi's construction

Büchi presented a doubly exponential complement construction 
in a logical form.
Here, we have his construction in the modern notation used in automata theory.
Let A = (Q,Σ,Δ,Q0,F) be a Büchi automaton.
Let ~A be an equivalence relation  over elements of Σ+ such that
for each v,w ∈ Σ+,
v ~A w if and only if for all p,q ∈ Q, 
A has a run from p to q over v if and only if this is possible over w 
and furthermore
A has a run via F from p to q over v if and only if this is possible over w.
Each class of ~A defines a map f:Q → 2Q × 2Q
in the following way:
for each state p ∈ Q, we have (Q1,Q2)= f(p), where
Q1 = {q ∈ Q | w can move automaton A from p
to q} and Q2 = {q ∈ Q | w can move automaton A from p
to q via a state 
in F}.
Note that Q2 ⊆ Q1.
If f is a map definable in this way, we denote the (unique) class defining f by Lf.

The following three theorems provide a construction of the complement of A 
using the equivalence classes of ~A.

Theorem 1: ~A has finitely many equivalent classes and each class is a regular language.
Proof:
Since there are finitely many f:Q → 2Q × 2Q, the relation ~A has finitely many equivalence classes.
Now we show that Lf is a regular language.
For p,q ∈ Q and i ∈ {0,1}, 
let Ai,p,q = ( {0,1}×Q, Σ, Δ1∪Δ2, {(0,p)}, {(i,q)} )
be a nondeterministic finite automaton,
where 
Δ1 =
{ ((0,q1),(0,q2)) | (q1,q2) ∈ Δ} ∪ 
{ ((1,q1),(1,q2)) | (q1,q2) ∈ Δ},
and
Δ2 = 
{ ((0,q1),(1,q2)) |
q1 ∈ F ∧ (q1,q2) ∈ Δ
}.
Let Q' ⊆ Q.
Let αp,Q' = ∩{ L(A1,p,q) | q ∈ Q'}, 
which is the set of words that can move A from p to all the states in Q' 
via some state in F.
Let βp,Q' = ∩{ L(A0,p,q)-L(A1,p,q)-{ε} | q ∈ Q'},
which is the set of non-empty words that can move A from p to all the states in Q'
and does not have a run that passes through any state in F.
Let γp,Q' = ∩{ Σ+-L(A0,p,q) | q ∈ Q'}, 
which is the set of non-empty words that cannot move A from p to any of the 
states in Q'. Since the regular languages are closed under finite intersections and under relative complements, every αp,Q', βp,Q', and γp,Q' is regular.
By definitions, 
Lf = ∩{ αp,Q2∩
βp,Q1-Q2∩
γp,Q-Q1
| (Q1,Q2)=f(p) ∧ p ∈ Q}.

Theorem 2: For each w ∈ Σω,
there are ~A classes Lf and Lg such that
w ∈ Lf(Lg)ω.

Proof: 
We will use the infinite Ramsey theorem 
to prove this theorem.
Let w =a0a1... and w(i,j) = ai...aj-1.
Consider the set of natural numbers N.
Let equivalence classes of ~A be the colors of subsets of N 
of size 2.
We assign the colors as follows.
For each i < j,
let the color of {i,j} be the equivalence class in which w(i,j) occurs.
By the infinite Ramsey theorem, we can find an infinite set X ⊆ N
such that each subset of X of size 2 has same color.
Let 0 < i0 < i1 < i2 .... ∈ X.
Let f be a defining map of an equivalence class such that 
w(0,i0) ∈ Lf.
Let g be a defining map of an equivalence class such that 
for each j>0,w(ij-1,ij) ∈ Lg.
Then w ∈ Lf(Lg)ω.

Theorem 3:  Let Lf and Lg be equivalence classes 
of ~A.
Then Lf(Lg)ω is either a subset of L(A) or 
disjoint from L(A). 
Proof: 
Suppose there is a word w ∈ L(A) ∩ Lf(Lg)ω, otherwise the theorem holds trivially.
Let r be an accepting run of A over input w.
We need to show that each word w' ∈ Lf(Lg)ω
is also in L(A), i.e., there exists a run r' of A over input w' such that
a state in F occurs in r' infinitely often.
Since w ∈ Lf(Lg)ω,
let w0w1w2... = w such that w0 ∈ Lf and for each i > 0, wi ∈ Lg.
Let si be the state in r after consuming w0...wi.
Let I be a set of indices such that i ∈ I if and only if the run segment in r 
from si to si+1 contains a state from F.
I must be an infinite set.
Similarly, we can split the word w'.
Let w'0w'1w'2... = w' such that w'0 ∈ Lf and for each i > 0, w'i ∈ Lg.
We construct r' inductively in the following way.
Let the first state of r' be same as r. By definition of Lf, 
we can choose a run segment on word w'0 to reach s0.
By induction hypothesis,
we have a run on w'0...w'i that reaches to si.
By definition of Lg,
we can extend the run along the word segment w'i+1 such that 
the extension reaches si+1 and visits a state in F if i ∈ I.
The r' obtained from this process will have infinitely many run segments 
containing states from F, since I is infinite.
Therefore, r' is an accepting run and w' ∈ L(A).

By the above theorems, we can represent Σω-L(A)
as finite union of ω-regular languages of the form Lf(Lg)ω, where Lf and Lg are equivalence classes of ~A.
Therefore, Σω-L(A) is an ω-regular language.
We can translate the language into a Büchi automaton. This construction is doubly exponential in terms of size of A.

References

Automata (computation)